My Forever is the debut album by the indie pop band He Is We. Aaron Gillespie also worked on this album.

Critical reception

Corey Apar of AllMusic said He is We "set the bar pretty high on their debut album", praising Rachel Taylor's vocals and the "simple pop music" replete "with sweet melody after sweet melody", but stated that "the music retains enough indie sensibility throughout to appeal to an audience wider than just the emo-pop crowd", highlighting the tracks "Everything You Do" and "Happily Ever After".

Track listing

Charts

References 

2010 debut albums
He Is We albums
Albums produced by Aaron Accetta